Shiloh is an unincorporated community in Marengo County, Alabama, United States.  Historically, Shiloh was served by its own post office.

Geography

Notable person
 Autherine Lucy, first African American student to attend the University of Alabama

References

Unincorporated communities in Alabama
Unincorporated communities in Marengo County, Alabama